The 2017–18 season was Zob Ahan Football Club's 17th season in the Iran Pro League, and their 22nd consecutive season in the top division of Iranian football. They also competed in the Hazfi Cup and AFC Champions League, and had their 47th year in existence as a football club.

Players

First-team squad
As of 30 May 2018.

Iran Pro League squad
As of 1 July 2017

 

 U21 = Under 21 Player
 U23 = Under 23 Player

ACL 2017 Squad

Loan list

Transfers
Confirmed transfers 2017–18

Summer

In:

Out:

Winter

In:

Out:

Competitions

Overview

Iran Pro League

Standings

Results summary

Results by round

Matches

AFC Champions League

AFC Champions League 2018

Play-off round

Group B

Round of 16

Hazfi Cup

Matches

Round of 32

Statistics

Appearances 

|}

Top scorers
Includes all competitive matches. The list is sorted by shirt number when total goals are equal.

Last updated on 15 May 2018

Friendlies and pre-season goals are not recognized as competitive match goals.

Top assistors
Includes all competitive matches. The list is sorted by shirt number when total assistors are equal.

Last updated on 14 May 2018

Friendlies and Pre season goals are not recognized as competitive match assist.

Disciplinary record
Includes all competitive matches. Players with 1 card or more included only.

Last updated on 15 May 2018

Goals conceded 
 Updated on 30 May 2016

Own goals 
 Updated on 5 January 2016

Club

Coaching staff

Other information

See also

 2017–18 Persian Gulf Pro League
 2017–18 Hazfi Cup
 2018 AFC Champions League

References

External links
Iran Premier League Statistics
Persian League

2017–18
Iranian football clubs 2017–18 season